Skartveit is a surname. Notable people with the surname include:

Andreas Skartveit (born 1937), Norwegian journalist, magazine editor, and publisher
Gro Skartveit (born 1965), Norwegian politician
Hanne Skartveit (born 1966), Norwegian journalist and political editor, daughter of Andreas